Shen Jun (born 27 June 1972) is a Chinese archer. He competed in the men's individual and team events at the 1996 Summer Olympics.

References

1972 births
Living people
Chinese male archers
Olympic archers of China
Archers at the 1996 Summer Olympics
Place of birth missing (living people)
20th-century Chinese people